St Thomas' Church is in Eskrick Street, Halliwell, a residential area of Bolton, Greater Manchester, England. It is an active Anglican parish church in the deanery of Bolton, the archdeaconry of Bolton, and the diocese of Manchester. Its benefice is united with those of five other local churches to form the Benefice of West Bolton. The church is recorded in the National Heritage List for England as a designated Grade II* listed building.

History

The church was built in 1874–75 to serve the growing local population, and designed by the Lancaster architects Paley and Austin. The main benefactors were the Cross family, mill owners who lived nearby at Mortfield, Thomas Cross giving the site for the church, a school and a vicarage, plus £1,000.  The reredos was given by his son, James Percival Cross.  The church was an early use by the architects of brick on such a large scale. For its size it was relatively inexpensive, costing £6,400 (equivalent to £ as of ), and providing seating for 849 people.  The church was consecrated in July 1875 by the Rt Revd James Fraser, Bishop of Manchester. A Lady Chapel was formed in 1922 as a war memorial. New vestries were added to the church in 1931–32 at a cost of £882 by Austin and Paley, successors in the Lancaster practice.  The planned northwest tower was never completed.

Architecture

Exterior
St Thomas' is constructed almost entirely in brick, with a minimum of stone dressings, and has green slate roofs. Its plan consists of a wide nave with a clerestory, north and south eight-bay aisles, north and south porches, a north transept with a bellcote, and a chancel with a two-storey vestry to its north. At the west end are stepped lancet windows flanked by rose windows. Below these is a central buttress, with a lancet window on each side of it. Each aisle bay contains a single lancet window, and there are 14 lancet windows along each side of the clerestory. The transept contains two lancets and a doorway with a rose window above them. The bellcote is louvred with a pyramidal roof, and forms a dormer. At the east end are stepped lancets. with a rose window above and blind arcading below.

Interior
The arcades have five bays, with round piers, leaf-and-crocket capitals, and brick arches.  The internal surfaces of the church are in plain brick almost throughout, the exception being the east wall below the level of the windows. The consists of lies set in brick recesses depicting features such as fleur-de-lis, angels, and the Instruments of the Passion.  The rectangular pulpit is in stone with marble shafts and an acanthus frieze. The sanctuary is floored with encaustic tiles. In the chancel is a piscina and a sedilia, both with segmental arches. The wooden reredos dates from 1893 and contains linenfold panels, flower motifs, figures of the apostles under canopies, and a low relief of The Last Supper. The choir stalls date from about 1911, and the altar from about 1960, replacing an earlier altar damaged by fire. The font dates from about 1950 and consists of a simple cylindrical basin. The stained glass in the east window of 1907 is possibly by Holland, windows in the aisles and Lady Chapel are by Shrigley and Hunt and date from about 1920, and the glass in one of the west windows is dated 1919. The organ was built in 1888 by Lewis, and was modified in 1902 and 1907 by the same company.

Assessment
The church was listed at Grade II* on 26 April 1974. Grade II* is the middle of the three gradings given by English Heritage, and is granted to buildings that "are particularly important buildings of more than special interest". Brandwood et al. state that the relative cheapness of the structure was achieved by using a 13th-century style of architecture, with lancet windows, an interior mainly of bare brick, stone being used only for a few dressings and the piers. Other than on the east wall, its decoration is minimal. This is consistent with its being designed for a low church style of worship, which the norm for Bolton at the time. Nevertheless, it is "a testimony to the effects of the Victorian ecclesiastical revolution on Anglican church-building for all persuasions".  Commenting on its structure, the authors of the Buildings of England series say that the church is "in its brick simplicity sensational for the date".

See also

Grade II* listed buildings in Greater Manchester
Listed buildings in Bolton
List of ecclesiastical works by Paley and Austin
List of ecclesiastical works by Austin and Paley (1916–44)

Notes

References

Bibliography

Halliwell
Halliwell
Halliwell
Churches completed in 1875
19th-century Church of England church buildings
Gothic Revival church buildings in England
Gothic Revival architecture in Greater Manchester
Paley and Austin buildings
Austin and Paley buildings
Buildings and structures in Bolton